Biral is an upazila of Dinajpur District in the Division of Rangpur, Bangladesh.

Geography
It has 37993 households and total area 352.16 km2.

Biral Upazila is bounded by Bochaganj and Kaharole  Upazilas on the north, Dinajpur Sadar Upazila and Punarbhaba River on the east, Dinajpur Sadar Upazila and Gangarampur and Kushmandi CD Blocks in Dakshin Dinajpur district, West Bengal, India, on the south, and Bochaganj Upazila, Kaliaganj CD Block in Uttar Dinajpur district in West Bengal, India and Kushmandi on the west.

Demographics
As of the 1991 Bangladesh census, Biral has a population of 2,04,420. Males constitute 52.57% of the population, and females 47.43%. This Upazila's population above 18 years is 101819. Biral has an average literacy rate of 27.9% (7+ years), and the national average of 32.4%.

Administration
Biral Thana was formed in 1915 and it was turned into an Upazila in 1984.

Biral Upazila is divided into ten union parishads: Azimpur, Bhandra, Birol, Bijora, Dhamoir, Dharmapur, Farakkabad, Mongalpur, Ranipukur, and Shohorgram. The union parishads are subdivided into 241 mauzas and 238 villages.

See also
Upazilas of Bangladesh
Districts of Bangladesh
Divisions of Bangladesh
Biral railway station

References

Upazilas of Dinajpur District, Bangladesh